Dongqiao is the name of the following locations in China:

Towns
 Dongjiao, Putian, ('Dongqiao') in Xiuyu District, Putian, Fujian
 Dongqiao, Hangzhou (洞桥镇), in Fuyang, Zhejiang
 Dongqiao, Ningbo (洞桥镇), in Yinzhou District
Written as "东桥镇":
 Dongqiao, Anhui, in Jin'an District, Lu'an
 Dongqiao, Hui'an County, Fujian
 Dongqiao, Minqing County, Fujian
 Dongqiao, Hubei, in Zhongxiang

Villages

 Dongqiao, Tibet  (东巧村)